WR 120 is a binary containing two Wolf-Rayet stars in the constellation of Scutum, around 10,000 light years away. The primary is a hydrogen-free weak-lined WN7 star, the secondary is a hydrogen-free WN3 or 4 star, and the system is a possible member of the cluster Dolidze 33. From our point of view, WR 120 is reddened by 4.82 magnitudes, and it has the variable designation of V462 Scuti.

Properties 
Analysis of the primary's spectrum with PoWR shows that it has a temperature of around 50,000 Kelvins, and is losing mass at a rate of  /year, or 1 solar mass every 80,000 years, which is being carried away from the surface at a speed of 1,225 kilometres per second. Taking its close distance into account, WR 120 A's luminosity turns out to be a mere , which would make it one of the dimmest WN stars known, and one of the only WN stars with a luminosity below . Using the WR Luminosity-Mass ratio, WR 120 may have a mass of just , one of the lowest masses of any WR star.

WR 120 is thought to be a member of Dolidze 33, an open cluster nearly 3,000 pc away.

Binarity 
In 2021, WR 120 was revealed to be a binary star. Previously, it was thought to be a single WR star, but it is in fact a rare double Wolf-Rayet star. The companion (a WN3/4 WR star) is located approximately 1700 AU from the primary WN7 WR, and is about 2.1 magnitudes fainter than WR 120.

References 

Wolf–Rayet stars
Scuti, V462
Scutum (constellation)